Passion of Spies (Shpionskiye strasti) is a 1967 Soyuzmultfilm's animated black-and-white film directed by Yefim Gamburg. It parodies spy and detective fiction clichés and got a status of a cult film.

Plot 
In Part 1, a foreign Intelligence agency chief Shtampf is suffering from a toothache. After learning about a wonderful, state-of-the-art dentist's chair invented in the Soviet Union, he develops a plan to steal it. His top agents pass information between each other, but Soviet agents catch them unaware, ending with a car chase where a musician-turned-chauffeur is injured. Part 2 tells the story of the chauffeur's idle son Kolychev, who tricks his parents out of money to attend a fancy restaurant. He is seduced by a foreign agent and tricked into buying a large bill, then convinced to plant a bomb beneath the dentist's chair in exchange for the bill being waived.

Animators 
 Tatyana Pomerantseva
 Elvira Maslova
 Ivan Davydov
 Joseph Kuroyan
 Renata Mirenkova
 Olga Orlova
 Dmitriy Anpilov
 Natalia Bogomolova
 Antonina Aleshina
 Yuriy Butyrin

References

External links

 Passion of Spies  at the Kinopoisk.ru

1967 films
Films directed by Yefim Gamburg
1960s Russian-language films
Soyuzmultfilm
Soviet black-and-white films
1960s parody films
1960s spy comedy films
Soviet animated films
Soviet spy comedy films
1967 comedy films